Shields may refer to:
Shields, Accomack County, Virginia
Shields, Prince Edward County, Virginia